The Wackiest Ship in the Army may refer to:

The Wackiest Ship in the Army (film), a 1960 comedy starring Jack Lemmon
The Wackiest Ship in the Army (TV series), a 1965 show based on the film